Elandapatti  is a village in Alathur taluk of Perambalur district, Tamil Nadu.

Demographics 

As per the 2001 census, Elandapatti had a population of 646 with 314 males and 332 females. The sex ratio was 1057 and the literacy rate, 51.8.

References 

 

Villages in Tiruchirappalli district